Sheri Norris (born February 2, 1964) is an American former professional tennis player.

A right-handed player from Topeka, Kansas, Norris was a three-time All-American at Arizona State and an NCAA semi-finalist as a senior in 1986. 

Following her graduation, Norris spent the remainder of the 1980s competing on the professional tour. Most notably, she qualified for the singles main draw of the 1988 Australian Open and also played mixed doubles at Wimbledon.

Norris now lives in Austin, Texas.

ITF finals

Singles: 2 (0–2)

References

External links
 
 

1964 births
Living people
American female tennis players
Arizona State Sun Devils women's tennis players
Tennis people from Kansas
Sportspeople from Topeka, Kansas